The discography of Beth Hart, an American singer-songwriter, comprises ten studio albums, one extended play, three collaboration albums, four live albums and three video albums.

Studio albums

As Beth Hart and The Ocean of Souls

Solo albums

Beth Hart with Joe Bonamassa

Extended plays

Live albums

Singles

Video albums

References

External links
 Beth Hart official website

Blues discographies
Discographies of American artists
Rock music discographies